So Pretty is an album by Kid Dakota.

Track listing

External links
[ So Pretty page at allmusic.com]

References

2002 debut albums
Kid Dakota albums